Steve Park (born 1967) is an American NASCAR driver.

Steve or Stephen Park may also refer to:

Steve Park (comedian), American comedian
Stephen Park (born 1962), British artist and performer
Stephen Park (British sport) (born 1968), Scottish yachtsman and performance director of British Cycling
 Stephen K. Park, author of the Park-Miller random number generator

See also
Stephen Parke (born 1950), New Zealand physicist